Sant Gadge Baba Amravati University, formerly Amravati University, named after Sant Gadge Baba, is a public state university located at Amravati in the Vidarbha region of the state of Maharashtra, India. Today, it is one of the largest universities in the country with 382 affiliated colleges and about 3.5 lakh students.

History 

The university was established on 1 May 1983 through the partitioning of Nagpur University.

The university campus is spread over an area of 225 hectares, and the university is home to 20 post-graduate departments offering 25 courses in different disciplines.

It has jurisdiction over five districts of Maharashtra: Akola, Amravati, Buldhana, Washim and Yavatmal.

Affiliations

Amravati University is recognized under Section 12(B) of the University Grants Commission (UGC) Act of the Ministry of Education, Government of India. The University received NAAC accreditation in  2002. 127 colleges are affiliated with Amravati University, with an enrollment of over 90,000 students for the undergraduate and graduate courses, together, in different faculties.

Amravati University is an associate member of the Association of Commonwealth Universities, London.

Colleges
 Shri Shivaji Science College, Amravati
 Government College of Engineering, Amravati
 Pankaj Laddad Institute of Technology, Buldhana
 Sipna College of Engineering & Technology, Amravati
 Dr. Rajendra Gode Institute of Technology and Research, Amravati
 Prof. Ram Meghe Institute of Technology & Research, Badnera - Amravati
 Babasaheb Naik College of Engineering, Pusad
 Shivaji Engineering College, Akola
 Anuradha Engineering College, Chikhli
 Prof. Ram Meghe College Of Engineering & Management, Badnera - Amravati
 P. R. Patil College of Engineering
 G. H. Raisoni College of Engineering & Management
 Hanuman Vyayam Prasarak Mandal's College of Engineering and Technology, Amravati
 Shri Sant Gajanan Maharaj College of Engineering, Shegaon

References

External links
 

 
Universities in Maharashtra
Education in Amravati
Educational institutions established in 1983
1983 establishments in Maharashtra